Banke National Park is located in the Lumbini Province and was established in 2010 as Nepal’s tenth national park after its recognition as a "Gift to the Earth".

Together with the neighboring Bardia National Park, the coherent protected area of  represents the Tiger Conservation Unit (TCU) Bardia-Banke.

Vegetation 
The vegetation in Banke National Park is composed of at least 113 tree species, 107 herbal species and 85 shrub and climber species. Common species include sal, axlewood, Semecarpus anacardium, khair, andTerminalia alata.

Fauna 
The protected area holds tiger and four-horned antelope. In 2014, a ruddy mongoose was recorded for the first time in the protected area.

References 

National parks of Nepal
Protected areas established in 2010
2010 establishments in Nepal